Mukkali Railway Station  is a major railway station serving the town of Mukkali in the Kozhikode District of Kerala, India.It lies in the Shoranur–Mangalore section of the Southern Railways.  Trains halting at the station connect the town to prominent cities in India such as Thiruvananthapuram, Kochi, Chennai, Kollam, Bangalore, Kozhikode, Coimbatore, Mangalore, Mysore  and so forth.

References

Railway stations in Kannur district
Palakkad railway division